Tardinghen  is a commune in the Pas-de-Calais department in the Hauts-de-France region of France.

Toponymy
Common to many French locales especially in the north, the etymology of Tardinghen is ultimately based in Germanic language roots.

Geography

Population

Places of interest
 The church of St. Martin, dating from the eighteenth century.
 An eighteenth-century manorhouse.
 Vestiges of the Atlantic Wall.
 Brasserie Artisanale des , local microbrewery.

See also
Communes of the Pas-de-Calais department

References

External links
 
 The history of Tardinghen on Histopale 

Communes of Pas-de-Calais